Within Mormonism, the priesthood authority to act in God's name was said by its founder, Joseph Smith, to have been removed from the primitive Christian church through a Great Apostasy, which Mormons believe occurred due to the deaths of the original apostles. Mormons maintain that this apostasy was prophesied of within the Bible to occur prior to the Second Coming of Jesus (see ) and was therefore in keeping with God's plan for mankind. Smith claimed that the priesthood authority was restored to him from angelic beings—John the Baptist and the apostles Peter, James, and John.

Some Christians have argued that a complete apostasy of the Christian church is impossible, because Christ is perfect. The Mormon belief is that Jesus, as Jehovah, also guided the Old Testament prophets and their followers, but that there are biblical descriptions of many apostasies amongst them, evidencing that Jehovah, who was perfect, did not intercede to prevent mankind from using agency and corrupting the true teachings and practices established through the prophets.

Most Christians believe that the canon of scripture is closed. Mormons believe in an open canon of scripture and accept the Bible, the Book of Mormon, the Doctrine and Covenants, and the Pearl of Great Price as scripture. Mormons also recognize a living prophet who has the authority to propose additions to the scriptural canon.

Political structure in early Mormonism

Early Mormonism established community legal structures as essentially theocracies (see theodemocracy). Joseph Smith and his successor, Brigham Young, presided over the Church of Jesus Christ of Latter-day Saints (LDS Church) as prophet, President of the Church, and spiritual king until Christ's assumption of world kingship at his Second Coming. U.S. President Millard Fillmore appointed Young governor of the Territory of Utah, and there was minimal effective separation between church and state until 1858.

Young envisioned a Mormon state spanning from the Salt Lake Valley to the Pacific Ocean; he sent church leaders to establish colonies far and wide. These colonies were governed by Mormon officials under Young's mandate to enforce "God's law" by "lay[ing] the ax at the root of the tree of sin and iniquity," while preserving individual rights. Despite the distance to these outlying colonies, local Mormon leaders received frequent visits from church headquarters, and were under Young's direct doctrinal and political control. Mormons were taught to obey the orders of their priesthood leaders, as long as they coincided with the church's religious principles. Young's view of theocratic enforcement included a death penalty. However, there are no documented cases showing that capital punishment was ever used by the Mormons. Mormon leaders taught the doctrine of blood atonement, in which Mormon "covenant breakers" could in theory gain their exaltation in heaven by having "their blood spilt upon the ground, that the smoke thereof might ascend to heaven as an offering for their sins." More clearly stated, this doctrine holds that capital punishment is required to atone for murder.

Commentator Thomas G. Alexander argues that most violent speech by Mormon leaders was rhetorical in nature and that statistical studies were needed to determine whether frontier Utah was more violent in reality than surrounding regions. Referring to the frequent Mormon declarations that there were fewer deeds of violence in Utah than in other pioneer settlements of equal population, the Salt Lake Tribune of January 25, 1876, stated: "It is estimated that no less than 600 murders have been committed by the Mormons, in nearly every case at the instigation of their priestly leaders, during the occupation of the territory. Giving a mean average of 50,000 persons professing that faith in Utah, we have a murder committed every year to every 2500 of population. The same ratio of crime extended to the population of the United States would give 16,000 murders every year." 
Whatever the case, there is evidence that occasionally local church leaders took the rhetoric of such doctrines seriously as they contemplated sanctionable applications of violence.

According to rumors and accusations, Brigham Young sometimes enforced "God's law" through a secret cadre of avenging Danites. The truth of these rumors is debated by historians. While there existed active vigilante organizations in Utah who referred to themselves as "Danites", they may have been acting independently. (For example, frontier Latter-day Saints Isaac C. Haight and William H. Dame were never Danites; however, Young's records indicate that in 1857 he authorized these two men to secretly execute two ex-convicts traveling through southern Utah along the California trail if they were caught stealing cattle. Dame replied to Young in a letter that "we try to live so when your finger crooks, we move." Haight and/or Dame might have been involved in the subsequent ambush of part of the convicts' party just south of Mountain Meadows.)

Notes

References 

 Briggs, Robert H. (2006), "The Mountain Meadows Massacre: An Analytical Narrative Based on Participant Confessions", Utah Historical Quarterly 74 (4):  313-333.
 Cannon, Frank J. & George L. Knapp (1913), Brigham Young and His Mormon Empire, New York: Fleming H. Revell Co..
 Fillmore, Millard (September 26, 1850), "I nominate Brigham Young, of Utah, as governor of the Territory of Utah", in McCook, Anson G., Journal of the Executive Proceedings of the Senate of the United States of America, vol. 8, Washington, D.C.: GPO, 1887, at 252
 Lee, John D. (1877), Bishop, William W., ed., Mormonism Unveiled; or the Life and Confessions of the Late Mormon Bishop, John D. Lee, St. Louis, Missouri: Bryan, Brand & Co..
 Melville, J. Keith (1960), "Theory and Practice of Church and State During the Brigham Young Era", BYU Studies 3 (1):  33–55.
 Parshall, Ardis E. (2005), "'Pursue, Retake and Punish': The 1857 Santa Clara Ambush", Utah Historical Quarterly 73 (1):  64-86.
 Quinn, D. Michael (1997), The Mormon Hierarchy: Extensions of Power. Salt Lake City: Signature Books in association with Smith Research Associates. .
Quinn, D. Michael (2001), "LDS 'Headquarters Culture' and the Rest of Mormonism: Past and Present", Dialogue: A Journal of Mormon Thought 34 (3–4):  135–64.
Young, Brigham (September 21, 1856d), "The People of God Disciplined by Trials—Atonement by the Shedding of Blood—Our Heavenly Father—A Privilege Given to all the Married Sisters in Utah", in Watt, G.D., Journal of Discourses by Brigham Young, President of the Church of Jesus Christ of Latter-day Saints, His Two Counsellors, and the Twelve Apostles, vol. 4, Liverpool: S.W. Richards, 1857, at 51–63.
Young, Brigham (July 5, 1857c), "True Happiness—Fruits of Not Following Counsel—Popular Prejudice Against the Mormons—The Coming Army—Punishment of Evildoers", in Calkin, Asa, Journal of Discourses Delivered by President Brigham Young, His Two Counsellors, the Twelve Apostles, and Others, vol. 5, Liverpool: Asa Calkin, 1858, at 1–6.

External links 

 "'The Living Oracles': Legal Interpretation and Mormon Thought" by Nathan Oman (Dialogue: A Journal of Mormon Thought)

Christian theology and politics
Latter Day Saint practices
History of the Church of Jesus Christ of Latter-day Saints
Mormonism-related controversies
Mormonism and violence
Mormonism and politics